Atnyashkino (Ätnäş) is a rural locality (a village) in Uryush-Bittulinsky Selsoviet, Karaidelsky District, Bashkortostan, Russia. The population was 61 as of 2010. There are 4 streets.

Geography 
Atnyashkino is located 40 km southwest of Karaidel (the district's administrative centre) by road. Nikolo-Kazanka is the nearest rural locality.

References 

Rural localities in Karaidelsky District